Vetapalem railway station (station code:VTM), is located at Vetapalem town of Prakasam district, in the Indian state of Andhra Pradesh. It is under the administration of Vijayawada Railway Division of South Central Railway zone. This station was well connected to Chennai, Bilaspur, Puri, Tirupati, Visakhapatnam, Vizianagaram, Nizamabad, Adilabad, Secunderabad, Bhimavaram, Guntur, Vijayawada, Chirala.

Classification 
In terms of earnings and outward passengers handled, Vetapalem is categorized as a Non-Suburban Grade-6 (NSG-6) railway station. Based on the re–categorization of Indian Railway stations for the period of 2017–18 and 2022–23, an NSG–6 category station earns nearly  crore and handles close to  passengers.

References 

Vijayawada railway division
Railway stations in Prakasam district